Derek Diorio is a Canadian writer, director, producer, and actor.

Derek Diorio arrived in Ottawa from Montreal in the mid-seventies to attend Carleton University. Within four years he had dropped out of Carleton but had picked up a valuable education at CKCU-FM, Carleton's campus radio station, where he acquired a taste for broadcast media and entertainment as well as an appreciation of the vast talent available in Ottawa. It was at CKCU that he developed a desire to create and be part of an Ottawa entertainment scene. Between 1979 and 1999 he co-founded Sound Venture Productions, the Ottawa Improv League, the Skit Row comedy troupe, the Skit Row Comedy Club, The Creative Block, Diorio Production, and Distinct Features Inc. He started his career as an award-winning radio advertising copywriter and moved on to co-write with Dan Lalande and Rick Jones for a number of Ottawa-based television series and specials, "You Can't Do That On Television", "The Raccoons" and "Skit Row". In the eighties, he produced, performed, and promoted several live stage productions with Skit Row in both the Theatre and Studio of the National Arts Centre while simultaneously developing a corporate video business. In the nineties, he started directing television shows for the then-nascent Canadian specialty channels.

Works

Writer
 You Can't Do That on Television (1982–1984)
 The Raccoons (1985–1988)
 The Adventures of Teddy Ruxpin (1987)
 The Railway Dragon (1988)
 The Teddy Bears' Picnic (1989)
 Kit & Kaboodle (1998)
 The Kiss of Debt (2000)
 The Quantum Tamers: Revealing our Weird and Wired Future (2009)
 Hard Rock Medical (2013-2017)

Director
 Two's a Mob (1998)
 The Kiss of Debt (2000)
 House of Luk (2001)
 Ottawa: Technically Funny (2001)
 Punch & Judy (2002)
 Francoeur (2003)
 Mann to Mann (2004)
 A Taste of Jupiter (2005)
 Meteo+ (2008-2011)
 Les Bleus de Ramville (2012-2013)
 Hard Rock Medical (2013-2017)
 Happy FKN Sunshine (2022)

Producer
 The Kiss of Debt (2000)
 House of Luk (2001)
 Ottawa: Technically Funny (2001)
 Punch & Judy (2002)
 Mann to Mann (2004)
 Getting Along Famously (2006)
 The Quantum Tamers: Revealing our Weird and Wired Future (2009)
 Fresh Meat (2012)
 Hard Rock Medical (2013-2017)
 The Fruit Machine (2018)

Actor
 The Raccoons (1985) - Haggis Lamborgini
 Babar and Father Christmas (1986) - Elderberry, Elf #2, Boatman
 Two's a Mob (1998) - Sonny Vendetta
 Ottawa: Technically Funny (2001) - Various
 Mann to Mann (2004) - Serge
 A Taste of Jupiter (2005) - Tony
 Lucky Days (2006) - Dean

References

External links
 

Year of birth missing (living people)
Living people
Canadian male film actors
Canadian male television actors
Canadian male voice actors
Canadian television directors
Canadian television producers
Canadian television writers
Canadian male television writers